Albert Joseph Williams (born 3 August 1916, date of death unknown) was an Australian rules footballer who played for the North Melbourne Football Club in the Victorian Football League (VFL).

Family
Albert Joseph Williams was born at Carlton, Victoria on 3 August 1916.

He married Doris Vivienne Jackman (1918–1964) in 1940.

Notes

References
 
 World War Two Nominal Roll: Private Albert Joseph Williams (VX87070), Department of Veterans' Affairs.

External links 
 
 
 Albert Williams, at The VFA Project

1916 births
Year of death missing
Australian rules footballers from Melbourne
North Melbourne Football Club players
Oakleigh Football Club players
People from Carlton, Victoria